Christina Kollmann (born 14 March 1988) is an Austrian former professional racing cyclist. She rode for the No Radunion Vitalogic team. At the end of July 2019, Kollmann was suspended for four years for doping violations, after which she announced her retirement.

See also
 List of 2015 UCI Women's Teams and riders

References

External links

1988 births
Living people
Austrian female cyclists
Doping cases in cycling
Austrian sportspeople in doping cases
Place of birth missing (living people)
21st-century Austrian women